Kyōsuke, Kyosuke or Kyousuke is a masculine Japanese given name. Notable people with the name include:

Kyousuke Hamao (born 1991), Japanese actor, singer and model
Kyosuke Himuro (born 1960), Japanese singer
Kyosuke Horie (born 1990), Japanese rugby union player
Kyōsuke Ikeda (born 1992), Japanese actor and voice actor who is affiliated with Gekidan Nihonjido
Kyōsuke Kindaichi (1882–1971), eminent Japanese linguist from Morioka, Iwate Prefecture
Kyosuke Kinoshita (born 1941), chairman of Acom Co., Ltd., a major consumer loan company in Japan
Kyousuke Motomi, Japanese manga artist
Kyosuke Usuta, prominent manga writer well known for working in the anthology Weekly Shonen Jump
, Japanese footballer

Fictional Characters
Kyōsuke Kamijō, a minor character in the anime/manga Puella Magi Madoka Magica
Kyosuke Kasuga, the protagonist of the anime/manga Kimagure Orange Road
Kyosuke Kosaka, a character from Oreimo
Kyousuke Natsume, a character in the anime Little Busters!
Kyōsuke Kuga, a character from Prince of Stride
Kyōsuke Munakata, a character in the light novel Papa to Kiss in the Dark
Kyosuke Munakata, a character from Danganronpa 3: The End of Hope's Peak High School
Kyosuke Imadori, a character from School Rumble
Kyousuke Kanou, a character from Hungry Heart: Wild Striker
Kyosuke Tokisaka (Date), the protagonist of the thirteen-episode anime The Soultaker who is the twin brother of Runa

Japanese masculine given names